The Croatian National Time Trial Championships is a cycling race where the Croatian cyclists decide who will become the champion for the year to come.

Men

Elite

U23

Women

See also
Croatian National Road Race Championships
National road cycling championships

Notes

References 

National road cycling championships
Cycle races in Croatia
1997 establishments in Croatia
Recurring sporting events established in 1997